The enzyme carbamoyl-serine ammonia-lyase (EC 4.3.1.13) catalyzes the chemical reaction

O-carbamoyl-L-serine + H2O = pyruvate + 2 NH3 + CO2 (overall reaction)
(1a) O-carbamoyl-L-serine = CO2 + NH3 + 2-aminoprop-2-enoate
(1b) 2-aminoprop-2-enoate = 2-iminopropanoate (spontaneous)
(1c) 2-iminopropanoate + H2O = pyruvate + NH3 (spontaneous)

This enzyme belongs to the family of lyases, specifically ammonia lyases, which cleave carbon-nitrogen bonds.  The systematic name of this enzyme class is O-carbamoyl-L-serine ammonia-lyase (decarboxylating; pyruvate-forming). Other names in common use include ''O-carbamoyl-L-serine deaminase, carbamoylserine deaminase, and O''-carbamoyl-L-serine ammonia-lyase (pyruvate-forming).  It employs one cofactor, pyridoxal phosphate.

References

 

EC 4.3.1
Pyridoxal phosphate enzymes
Enzymes of unknown structure